Hunkins is a surname. It may refer to:
 Eusebia Hunkins (1902-1980), American composer

The Massachusetts-Wisconsin Hunkins family:
 Robert Hunkins, Sr. (born 1679), a snowshoe soldier and Hunkins family progenitor 
 Robert Hastings Hunkins (born  1774), a historical figure known for being a Wisconsin territory early settler
 Benjamin Hunkins (born 1810), an early Wisconsin politician who had a role in shaping the Wisconsin constitution

See also 
 The surname Hunkin